Yee Chih-yen (born 21 November 1959) is a Taiwanese film director.

Biography
Yee Chih-yen attended UCLA between 1983 and 1988.

Filmography
 Lonely Hearts Club (1994)
 Blue Gate Crossing (2002)
 About Love (2005)
 Dangerous Mind (2006)
 Meeting Dr. Sun (2015)

Awards
 Best Dramatic Feature, Japan Osaka Asian Film Festival(ASFF) Meeting Dr. Sun (2015)
 Best TV series, Taiwan TV Golden Bell Awards for Dangerous Mind (2007)
 Outstanding Co-Production Film, China Huabiao Film Awards for About Love (2005)
 Special Jury Prize, Bratislava International Film Festival for Blue Gate Crossing (2002)

References

External links
 

1959 births
Living people
Film directors from Taipei
LGBT film directors